Coeneo de la Libertad is a town and municipal seat of the Coeneo municipality, located in the north central area of the Mexican state of Michoacán.  The name Coeneo means "place of birds".

History

In the year 1530 Friar Martín de la Coruña was the first to come into contact with the natives of the lands that now make up the present-day Coeneo.  He quickly gained trust, affection, and respect, and convinced the natives to convert to the Catholic faith.  However, the Spanish conquistador Nuño de Guzmán attempted to rob the natives of their possessions and abuse them for refusing to comply.  This caused a period where the natives went back into the mountains and to destroy the progress that Martín de la Coruña had made.  It was until the Friar Jacob Dacian succeeded de la Coruña that dialogue began again.  An arrangement was made in 1542 for a few families to reallocate to the location now known as Coeneo due to a scarcity of water around the region.  Once the new community was established plans were drafted to construct the town's church, a town square, and a patron was given "La Virgen del Rosario."

Demographics
As of the census of 2005, there were 3616 people residing in the town.

Education
Coeneo enjoys a diverse set of both public and private schools.

Two pre-elementary schools
A public elementary school
A private elementary school - Institucion Educativa y Cultural Coeneo
A public middle school - Escuela secundaria tecnica #61
A COBAM (high school)
A center for adult education

Economy
The area around Coeneo is centered on agriculture where lentils and corn are the main crops cultivated. Non-agricultural industries are mainly related to construction materials, financial institutions, and small family-operated businesses.

Towns in Coeneo municipality
Coeneo de la Libertad
Santiago Azajo
Pretoria
El Rodeo
Tunguitiro
San Isidro
Cotiro
Matugeo
 Ojo De Agüita
Colonia Benito Juarez
El Transvaal
Zipiajo
El Cobrero    
Colonia Primo Tapia                 
La Cañada
Laredo
Quencio
San Pedro Tacaro
Bellas Fuentes
La Cofradia
Emiliano Zapata
Comanja
Aguas Caliente
Chahueto
La Constitución

Transportation 
There are several bus lines that serve the routes to Huaniqueo, Morelia or Zacapu such as "Autobuses Bellas Fuentes", "Autobuses Ciénega de Zacapu" and "Norte de Michoacán", in addition to providing a foreign and suburban collective service to Zipiajo, El Cobrero, and Tinguitiro.

References

External links

Populated places in Michoacán